Łobozew may refer to the following places in Poland:

Łobozew Dolny
Łobozew Górny